A power of 10 is any of the integer powers of the number ten; in other words, ten multiplied by itself a certain number of times (when the power is a positive integer). By definition, the number one is a power (the zeroth power) of ten. The first few non-negative powers of ten are:

1, 10, 100, 1,000, 10,000, 100,000, 1,000,000, 10,000,000. ...

Positive powers
In decimal notation the nth power of ten is written as '1' followed by n zeroes. It can also be written as 10n or as 1En in E notation. See order of magnitude and orders of magnitude (numbers) for named powers of ten. There are two conventions for naming positive powers of ten, beginning with 109, called the long and short scales. Where a power of ten has different names in the two conventions, the long scale name is shown in parentheses. 

The positive 10 power related to a short scale name can be determined based on its Latin name-prefix using the following formula:
10[(prefix-number + 1) × 3]

Examples:
 billion = 10[(2 + 1) × 3] = 109
 octillion = 10[(8 + 1) × 3] = 1027

Negative powers

The sequence of powers of ten can also be extended to negative powers.

Similar to the positive powers, the negative power of 10 related to a short scale name can be determined based on its Latin name-prefix using the following formula:
10−[(prefix-number + 1) × 3]

Examples:
 billionth = 10−[(2 + 1) × 3] = 10−9
 quintillionth = 10−[(5 + 1) × 3] = 10−18

Googol 

The number googol is 10100. The term was coined by 9-year-old Milton Sirotta, nephew of American mathematician Edward Kasner.  It was popularized in Kasner's 1940 book Mathematics and the Imagination, where it was used to compare and illustrate very large numbers. Googolplex, a much larger power of ten (10 to the googol power, or 1010100), was also introduced in that book. (Read below)

Googolplex 
 

The number googolplex is 10googol, or 1010,000,000,000,000,000,000,000,000,000,000,000,000,000,000,000,000,000,000,000,000,000,000,000,000,000,000,000,000,000,000,000,000,000, and was also made by Edward Kasner's nephew. (Read above)

Scientific notation

Scientific notation is a way of writing numbers of very large and very small sizes compactly when precision is less important.

A number written in scientific notation has a significand (sometime called a mantissa) multiplied by a power of ten.

Sometimes written in the form:

 m × 10n

Or more compactly as:

 10n

This is generally used to denote powers of 10.  Where n is positive, this indicates the number of zeros after the number, and where the n is negative, this indicates the number of decimal places before the number.

As an example:

 105 = 100,000
 10−5 = 0.00001

The notation of mEn, known as E notation, is used in computer programming, spreadsheets and databases, but is not used in scientific papers.

See also
Power of two
Power of three 
SI prefix
Cosmic View, inspiration for the film Powers of Ten
Exponentiation
Philip and Phylis Morrison wrote a book called "Powers of Ten: A Book About the Relative Size of Things in the Universe and the Effect of Adding Another Zero"  to accompany the video of Eames.

Further reading 
Video
Powers of Ten (1977). Nine-minute film. US Public Broadcasting Service (PBS), made by Charles and Ray Eames. "An adventure in magnitudes. Starting at a picnic by the lakeside in Chicago, this film transports the viewer to the outer edges of the universe. Every ten seconds we view the starting point from ten times farther out until our own galaxy is visible only as a speck of light among many others. Returning to Earth with breathtaking speed, we move inward - into the hand of the sleeping picnicker - with ten times more magnification every two seconds. Our journey ends inside a proton of a carbon atom within a DNA molecule in a white blood cell."

References

Powers of ten
Integer sequences
Orders of magnitude